AC Majapahit (or abbreviated Associazione Calcio Majapahit) is an Indonesian semi-professional football team based in Mojokerto Regency, East Java. AC Majapahit currently competes in Liga 3.

History
AC Majapahit's predecessor was  Jember United FC. In 2021, Jember United was acquired by PT Patriots Pamenang Majapahit and moved its homebase from Jember Regency to Mojokerto Regency.

Players

Current squad

Stadium
To navigate the competition 2021 Liga 3, AC Majapahit used Gajah Mada Stadium, Mojokerto Regency.

References

External links

Mojokerto Regency
Football clubs in Indonesia
Football clubs in East Java
Sport in East Java
2021 establishments in Indonesia
Association football clubs established in 2021